The 1930 United States Senate election in Alabama was held on November 4, 1930.

Incumbent U.S. Senator James Thomas Heflin was denied the Democratic nomination for supporting Republican Herbert Hoover in 1928. He ran as an independent candidate in the general election but lost re-election to John H. Bankhead II.

Democratic primary

Candidates
 John H. Bankhead II, businessman and candidate for Senate in 1926
 Fred I. Thompson

Results

General election

Results

See also 
 1930 United States Senate elections

References

 

1930
Alabama
1930 Alabama elections